Joe Thunder Armstrong Nagbe (born 2 September 1968) is a Liberian former professional footballer who played as a midfielder. He spent at least ten years playing in Europe, starting off with Monaco then on to Nice. He played in Greece for three years.

Personal life 
Nagbe is married and has two sons and two daughters. His daughter Martha plays basketball. He is the father to Darlington Nagbe who is a midfielder for Columbus Crew in Major League Soccer.

Playing career
Born in Nimba County, Nagbe started his football sojourn with Young Survivor of Clara Town from 1982 to 1985.

He then joined Invincible Eleven (IE) in 1985 and thereafter played between 1986 and 1987 for Mighty Barolle before returning to IE, where he stayed up to 1988 after winning the National League title.

Along with fellow Liberian international James Debbah, Nagbe moved to Union Douala of Cameroon for the 1989 to 1990 season.

Nagbe and Debbah joined George Weah at AS Monaco for the 1989–90 season and then found himself at SAS Épinal from 1990 to 1993. The three seasons that followed saw Nagbe at OGC Nice, where he alongside Debbah, were successful, including a French Cup final win over Guingamp that had another Liberian Christopher Wreh. Nagbe had the opportunity of serving as captain of Nice.

His next transfer led him to Switzerland with AC Lugano for the season of 1996–97 and afterwards, Greece became the next destination for the Liberian that has played the roles of striker, midfielder and defender during his outstanding career.

Nagbe together with his colleagues made history for the Lone Star when Liberia qualified for her first African Cup of Nations finals in South Africa. Before then, the Lone Star defeated the Tunisia, Mauritania and Togo, but drew with Senegal at home.

Nagbe was then at PAOK for three seasons (1997–2000) and later at Panionios (2000–2001). The next season, he played for Giannina (2001–2002), the period with him as captain when the Lone Star reached another African Nations Cup finals but narrowly missed out on the 2002 World Cup in Korea and Japan.

His final journey before heading for retirement led Nagbe to Indonesia, where he reunited with dozens of his countrymen. There, he played for PSPS, Persema Malang and PSIM Yogyakarta.

He began playing for the Liberian national team in 1986 and ended in 2001 with 75 caps.

In June 2011 Nagbe came out of retirement to play against Cape Verde.

Coaching career
Upon retiring as a player, Nagbe traveled to Brazil and is now professional soccer coach, recognized by FIFA, CBF, UEFA and other established soccer organizations.

References

External links 
 Player profile and statistics at liberiansoccer.com
 
 
 

Living people
1968 births
People from Nimba County
Association football midfielders
Liberian footballers
Liberia international footballers
1996 African Cup of Nations players
Ligue 1 players
Super League Greece players
UAE Pro League players
Panionios F.C. players
AS Monaco FC players
SAS Épinal players
OGC Nice players
Union Douala players
FC Lugano players
PAOK FC players
PAS Giannina F.C. players
Invincible Eleven players
Persema Malang players
Mighty Barrolle players
PSIM Yogyakarta players
Al Jazira Club players
PSPS Pekanbaru players
Persiba Bantul players
Liberian expatriate footballers
Liberian expatriate sportspeople in France
Expatriate footballers in France
Liberian expatriate sportspeople in Monaco
Expatriate footballers in Monaco
Liberian expatriate sportspeople in Greece
Expatriate footballers in Greece
Liberian expatriate sportspeople in Switzerland
Expatriate footballers in Switzerland
Liberian expatriate sportspeople in Indonesia
Expatriate footballers in Indonesia